Parkent is a district of Tashkent Region in Uzbekistan. The capital lies at the city Parkent. The district consists of one city (Parkent), 3 urban-type settlements (Quyosh, Qoʻrgʻontepa, Chinorli) and 9 rural communities (Zarkent, Qoraqalpoq, Boʻston, Nomdanak, Parkent, Soʻqoq, Xisarak, Boshqizilsoy, Changi).

References

Districts of Uzbekistan
Tashkent Region